Phi Lambda Sigma is an American college honor society for pharmacy students. It was founded at Auburn University in March 1965, with the support of brothers from Chi chapter of Phi Delta Chi, the Professional Pharmaceutical Sciences Fraternity, also on the Auburn campus.

By 2018 Phi Lambda Sigma had approximately 30,000 members. The mission of Phi Lambda Sigma, also known as the National Pharmacy Leadership Society, is to support pharmacy leadership commitment by recognizing leaders and fostering leadership development. The society was admitted to the Association of College Honor Societies (ACHS) in 2018.

References

External links
 
  ACHS Phi Lambda Sigma entry
  Phi Lambda Sigma chapter list at ACHS

Association of College Honor Societies
Student organizations established in 1965
Business organizations based in the United States
1965 establishments in Alabama